The Vivacity is a range of motor scooters produced by the French motorcycle manufacturer Peugeot Motocycles.

Vivacity 1+2
Peugeot Motocycles began producing the Vivacity 1+2 in 1998 and continued until 2008 when it was redesigned. One of the most powerful 50cc standard scooters, in its original specification, this version could reach .
This model came to compete with the Yamaha BWs 50cc. It can reach 9000 rpm, producing . 
The Vivacity 1+2 proved be one of Peugeot's biggest commercial successes owing to its design and economical and powerful motor.
The engines are easy to modify and can make a performance racing moped.

Vivacity 3

In 2008 Peugeot unveiled a new design for the Vivacity. With a bigger storage area under the seat and in the front plastics it has almost twice the storage capabilities of the Vivacity 1+2. Also new is a 12-volt charger for any accessories such as satellite navigation.

In 2012, an electric version of the scooter called E-Vivacity was produced.

References

Vivacity
Motorcycles introduced in 1998
Motor scooters